

The CETEC-303 CB.7 Vesper is a Brazilian motor glider designed by Cláudio de Barros.

Design and development
Built from glassfibre, the Vesper is a low-wing cantilever monoplane with conventional landing gear and a T-tail with a tandem seat. Powered by front-mounted 80 hp Limbach L2000 with 80 HP. A bubble-like cabin with ample visibility. It used two domestically manufactured propellers. It was developed with the intention of producing hundreds, but due to the Brazilian crisis in the late 1980s, the idea was put aside.

Specification

See also

References

Bibliography

External links
 

1980s Brazilian sport aircraft
Motor gliders
Low-wing aircraft
Single-engined tractor aircraft
T-tail aircraft
Aircraft first flown in 1988